Khoshk Rud (also Romanized as Khoshk Rūd, Khoshkerūd, and Khoshk-e Rūd; also known as Khoshg Rood Lasht Nesha and Khoshkehrūd) is a village in Jirhandeh-ye Lasht-e Nesha Rural District, Lasht-e Nesha District, Rasht County, Gilan Province, Iran. At the 2006 census, its population was 339, in 102 families.

References 

Populated places in Rasht County